Zdzisław Jan Ryn (21 October 1938 – 6 February 2022) was a Polish diplomat. He served as Polish ambassador to Chile from 1991 to 1997 and Ambassador to Argentina from 2007 to 2008. 

Jan Ryn died in Kraków on 6 February 2022, at the age of 83.

References

1938 births
2022 deaths
Polish diplomats
Ambassadors of Poland to Chile
Ambassadors of Poland to Argentina
Members of the Polish Academy of Learning
People from Bielsko County